JSSR may refer to:
 Journal for the Scientific Study of Religion
 The Journal of Social Studies Research
 Justice and security sector reform